Six Dates with Barker is a series of six one-off, half-hour situation comedies showcasing the talents of Ronnie Barker. All were broadcast by London Weekend Television early in 1971.

Writers on the series included John Cleese and Spike Milligan. The producer was Humphrey Barclay.

Episode list

Show 1 – 1937: The Removals Person
Transmitted 8 January 1971
Barker plays Fred, a short sighted removals man who works whilst the owner of the house watches The Coronation. Also starring Joan Benham, Gillian Fairchild, Nan Braunton, Josephine Tewson and Christopher Timothy. Written by Hugh Leonard.
Show 2 – 1899: The Phantom Raspberry Blower of Old London Town
Transmitted 15 January 1971
A mysterious figure who blows raspberries at people terrifies Victorian London. Also starring Alan Curtis, Moira Foot, Larry Noble, Christine Ozanne and John Sharp. Written by Spike Milligan.
Show 3 – 1970: The Odd Job
Transmitted 22 January 1971
When his wife leaves him, Barker hires a passing odd job man to kill him when he least expects it. When his wife returns he finds his previous request impossible to cancel. Also starring David Jason, Joan Sims, Derek Ware, Larry Martyn and George Waring. Written by Bernard McKenna. This episode was videotaped in black and white owing to the 1971 ITV Colour Strike. In 1978 this episode was remade as a feature length film with Graham Chapman taking Barker's role and David Jason reprising his role as the odd job man.
Show 4 – 1915: Lola
Transmitted 29 January 1971
 A top female agent goes missing after the German Head of Espionage fails to monitor her properly. Also starring Graham Armitage, Valentine Dyall, Freddie Earlle, Freddie Jones, Dennis Ramsden, Peter Stephens and Hugh Walters. Written by Ken Hoare and Mike Sharland.
Show 5 – 1971: Come in and Lie Down
Transmitted 5 February 1971
Barker plays Dr Swanton, a psychiatrist who is visited by a patient (Michael Bates), who is so terrified of being diagnosed with mental problems, he pretends to be a gasman. Written by John Cleese.
Show 6 – 2774 AD: All the World's a Stooge
Transmitted 12 February 1971
In the far future, comedy has become the religion of the world and there are dire consequences for those who do not join in. Also starring Lesley-Anne Down, Joyce Grant, Michael Hordern and Victor Maddern. Based on an outline by Gerald Wiley (Barker's pseudonym) and Maurice Murphy.

Spin-offs
There were several spin-offs to come from this series.

 The Phantom Raspberry Blower of Old London Town was turned into a serial for the 1976 series of The Two Ronnies, David Jason performed the required 'Raspberrys' blown by the Phantom (but did not appear on screen). Actor David Rowlands appeared as The Phantom in the penultimate instalment.
 The Odd Job Man became a 1978 film, retitled The Odd Job. Extended from the original TV version to feature length. Though this time, original co-writer Graham Chapman took Barker's part, Diana Quick took the part of his wife, originally played by Joan Sims. David Jason as the hitman was the sole original cast member in this movie (though even his part was at first going to be played by Keith Moon).
 The Removals Persons was turned into Ronnie Barker's final TV series Clarence, seventeen years after the original was made. This time the series was written by Barker using the pseudonym Bob Ferris. This was the name of Rodney Bewes' character in BBC sitcom The Likely Lads, and the name was in tribute to writers Clement and La Frenais. Josephine Tewson reprised her role as Barker's co-star.

Archive status and DVD release
Unlike many television programmes of the time, all six shows exist in the archives. They have been released by Network DVD, both as a single-disc individual release and together with Hark at Barker as The Ronnie Barker Collection.

References

External links
Six Dates With Barker at the bbc.co.uk Guide to Comedy
Paul Lewis, 2008: Review of the Network DVD release of Six Dates With Barker. DVDCompare
Six Dates With Barker at the British Film Institute

1971 British television series debuts
1971 British television series endings
1970s British anthology television series
ITV sitcoms
London Weekend Television shows
English-language television shows
1970s British comedy television series